Bled White is a 2011 horror film written and directed by Jose Carlos Gomez and starring North Roberts, Matthew Prochazka, and Colleen Boag. The film was shot around the Chicago area, during the winter. It went on to win several awards.

Premise
The story centers around six characters who must survive a post-apocalyptic disaster. The movie is told in chapters, all of which come together at the end.

Festivals and awards
 Tabloid Witch Awards, 2009; Best Supporting Actress (Colleen Boag), Best Soundtrack Actress (DC McAuliffe), and Honorable Mention (Jose Carlos Gomez).
 ScareFest Horror and Paranornal Convention, 2010; Official Selection.
 Geneva Film Festival, 2009; Official Selection.
 Fear Fete Film Festival, 2011; Best Zombie Feature.
 8th Annual South African Horror Fest, 2012; Official Selection.
 Living Dead Film Festival, 2012; Best Actor (North Roberts), and Director's Choice Award.

Reception
Bled White received positive reviews from critics. Horror Society called the film "one hell of a zombie flick."

See also
List of apocalyptic and post-apocalyptic fiction

References

External links
 

2011 horror films
American post-apocalyptic films